Dangaléat (also known as Dangla, Danal, Dangal) is an Afro-Asiatic language spoken in central Chad. Speakers make up the majority of the population of Migami Canton in Mongo, Chad.

Phonemes
Consonants (Central Dangaleat, Burke 1995)

Vowels

Notes

References
 Baldi, Sergio. 2007. Les emprunts arabe en dangaleat. In: Henry Tourneux (ed.), Topics in Chadic Linguistics III: Historical Studies. Papers from the 3rd Biennial International Colloquium on the Chadic Languages, 27–36. Cologne: Rüdiger Köppe.
 Boyeldieu, Pascal. 1977. Notes linguistiques. In: Jean-Pierre Caprile (ed.), Études phonologiques tchadiennes, 233–237. Paris: SELAF.
 Lawrence R. Burke.  1995.  An Introduction to the Verbal System of Central Dangaleat. University of North Dakota MA thesis.
 Jacques Fedry.  1977.  "Apercu sur la phonologie et la tonologie de quatre langues du groupe Mubi-Karbo (Guera, Dangaleat-est, Dangaleat-ouest, Bidiyo, Dyongor)," Etudes Phonologiques Chadiennes.  Ed. J. Caprile.  Paris:  SELAF.  Pages 87–112.
 Ebobissé, Carl. 1978. Ein Tiermärchen aus dem Ost-Dangaleat. Africana Marburgensia 11, 1:3–18.
 Ebobissé, Carl. 1979. Die Morphologie des Verbs im Ost-Dangaleat (Guera, Tschad). Berlin: Dietrich Reimer.
 Ebobissé, Carl. 1980. L'injoctif en dangaléat de l'est. Africana Marburgensia, Special Issue 4:41–47.
 Ebobissé, Carl. 1985. L'apotonie et l'apophonie dans le système verbal du dangaléat de l'est. In: Langues tchadiques et langues non tchadiques en contact en Afrique Centrale. Paris: SELAF.
 Ebobissé, Carl. 1987. Les verbaux du dangaléat de l'est (Guéra, Tchad). Berlin: Dietrich Reimer.
 Fédry, Jacques. 1969. Syntagmes de détermination en dangaléat. Journal of West African Languages 6, 1:5–19.
 Fédry, Jacques. 1971a. Dictionnaire dangaléat. Thèse de 3e cycle, Lyon.
 Fédry, Jacques. 1971b. Masculin, féminin et collectif en dangaléat. Journal of African Languages 10, 1:34–46.
 Fédry, Jacques. 1971c. Phonologie du dangaléat. Thèse de 3e cycle, Lyon.
 Fédry, Jacques. 1974. Pátó à l'est, pàtò à l'ouest, ou l'énigme tonale des parlers dangaléat (Guéra, Tchad). Paper presented at the 11th Congress of the Société Linguistique de l'Afrique de l'Ouest, Yaoundé, April 1974.
 Fédry, Jacques. 1977. Aperçu sur la phonologie et la tonologie de quatre langues du groupe “Mubi-Karbo” (Guéra): dangaléat est, dangaléat ouest, bidiyo, dyongor. In: Jean-Pierre Caprile (ed.), Études phonologiques tchadiennes, 87–112. Paris: Société des Etudes Linguistiques et Anthropologiques de France (SELAF).
 Fédry, Jacques. 1981. Le Dangaleat. In: Jean Perrot (ed.), Les langues dans le monde ancien et moderne. CNRS: Paris.
 Fedry, Jaques. 1990. Verbes monosyllabiques en dangaléat. In: Herrmann Jungraithmayr and Henri Tourneux (eds.), Études tchadiques, 9–13. Paris: Librairie Orientaliste Paul Geuthner.
 Frajzyngier, Zygmunt. 2005. L'augment telique ('goal') dans les langues tchadiques. In: Antoine Lonnet and Amina Mettouchi (eds.), Les langues chamito-sémitiques (afro-asiatiques), vol. 1, 215–230. Paris: Ophrys.
 Frajzyngier, Zygmunt, Holly Krech, and Armik Mirzayan. 2002. Motivation for copulas in equational clauses. Linguistic Typology 6(2): 155–198.
 Montgolfier, Paul de. 1973. Dictionnaire dangaléat (kaawo dangla). Avec la collaboration de Bada, Adoum, and Djibrine Zaid.
 Shay, Erin. 1994. Complementation and modality: Two complementizers in East Dangla. Colorado Research in Linguistics 13:79–91.
 Shay, Erin. 1999. A grammar of East Dangla: The simple sentence. Ph.D. dissertation, University of Colorado. UMI.
 Shay, Erin. 2008. Coding the unexpected. In: Zygmunt Frajzyngier and Erin Shay (eds.). Interaction of Morphology and Syntax: case studies in Afroasiatic, 85–106. Philadelphia: John Benjamins Publishing Company.

East Chadic languages
Languages of Chad